Wahid Baksh Bhutto (1898 – 25 December 1931) was a landowner of Sindh, and an elected representative to the Central Legislative Assembly of India.

Sindhi people
Wahid Baksh
1898 births
1931 deaths
Politicians from Sindh
Members of the Central Legislative Assembly of India
20th-century Indian philanthropists